The 1974 Liège–Bastogne–Liège was the 60th edition of the Liège–Bastogne–Liège cycle race and was held on 21 April 1974. The race started and finished in Liège. The race was won by Georges Pintens of the  team.

General classification

Notes

References

1974
1974 in Belgian sport